Goat farming involves the raising and breeding of domestic goats (Capra aegagrus hircus) as a branch of animal husbandry. People farm goats principally for their  meat,  milk, fibre and  skins.

Goat farming can be very suited to production alongside other livestock (such as sheep and cattle) on low-quality grazing land. Goats efficiently convert sub-quality grazing matter that is less desirable for other livestock into quality lean meat.  Furthermore, goats can be farmed with a relatively small area of pasture and with limited resources.

Pasture

As with other herbivores, the number of animals that a goat farmer can raise and sustain is dependent on the quality of the pasture. However, since goats will eat vegetation that most other domesticated livestock decline, they will subsist even on very poor land. Therefore, goat herds remain an important asset in regions with sparse and low quality vegetation.

Worldwide goat population statistics 

According to the Food and Agriculture Organization (FAO), the top producers of goat milk in 2008 were India (4 million metric tons), Bangladesh (2.16 million metric tons) and the Sudan (1.47 million metric tons).

In the US
Meat goats are farmed in all US states, although most meat goat production occurs in the Southeast.  Texas is the primary producer of meat goats, representing 38% of US production.

Meat 

Three-quarters of the global population eat goat meat.  It comprises 5% of worldwide meat consumption and 8% of red meat.

Goat meat contains low amounts of saturated fatty acids and cholesterol.  It is considered to be a healthier alternative to other types of red meat.

The taste of goat kid meat has been reported as similar to that of spring lamb meat.  In some localities (e.g. the Caribbean, Bangladesh, Pakistan and India) the word “mutton” is used to describe both goat and lamb meat. However, some compare the taste of goat meat to veal or venison, depending on the age and condition of the goat.  The flavour is primarily linked to the presence of 4-methyloctanoic and 4-methylnonanoic acid.

Goat meat can be prepared in a variety of ways, including stewing, baking, grilling, barbecuing, canning, and frying; it can be minced, curried, or made into sausage. Because of its low fat content, the meat can toughen at high temperatures if cooked without additional moisture. One of the most popular goats farmed for meat is the South African Boer, introduced into the United States in the early 1990s.  The New Zealand Kiko is also considered a meat breed, as is the myotonic or "fainting goat".

Milk, butter and cheese 

Goats produce about 2% of the world's total annual milk supply. Some goats are bred specifically for milk.  Unprocessed goat milk has small, well-emulsified fat globules, which means the cream remains suspended in the milk instead of rising to the top, as in unprocessed cow milk; therefore, it does not need to be homogenized. Indeed, if goat milk is to be used to make cheese, homogenization is not recommended, as this changes the structure of the milk, affecting the culture's ability to coagulate the milk and the final quality and yield of cheese.  Dairy goats in their peak milk production (generally around the third or fourth lactation cycle) average——of milk production daily—roughly —during a ten-month lactation, producing more just after freshening and gradually dropping in production toward the end of their lactation.  The milk generally averages 3.5% butterfat.

Goat milk is commonly processed into cheese, butter, ice cream, yogurt, cajeta and other products.  Goat cheese is known as fromage de chèvre ("goat cheese") in France. Some varieties include Rocamadour and Montrachet.  Goat butter is white because goats produce milk with the yellow beta-carotene converted to a colourless form of vitamin A.

Male goats are generally not required for the dairy-goat industry and are usually slaughtered for meat soon after birth.  In the UK, approximately 30,000 billy goats from the dairy industry are slaughtered each year.

Fibre 

Most goats have soft insulating hairs near the skin and longer guard hairs on the surface. The desirable fibre for the textile industry is the former; it has several names including "down", "cashmere" and "pashmina". The guard hairs are of little value as they are too coarse, difficult to spin and difficult to dye.

In South Asia, cashmere is called "pashmina" (from Persian pashmina, "fine wool").
In the 18th and early 19th centuries, Kashmir (then called Cashmere by the British), had a thriving industry producing shawls from goat-hair imported from Tibet and Tartary through Ladakh.  The shawls were introduced into Western Europe when the General in Chief of the French campaign in Egypt (1799–1802) sent one to Paris. Since these shawls were produced in the upper Kashmir and Ladakh region, the wool came to be known as "cashmere".

The cashmere goat produces a commercial quantity of cashmere wool, which is one of the most expensive natural fibres commercially produced; cashmere is very fine and soft.

Angora goats produce long, curling, lustrous locks of mohair. Their entire body  is covered with mohair and there are no guard hairs. The locks constantly grow to 9 cm or more in length.  Angora crossbreeds, such as the pygora and the nigora, have been selected to produce mohair and/or cashgora on a smaller, easier-to-manage animal.

Goat skin

The skin of goats is a valuable by product of goat farming. Up until 1849 all Rolls of Parliament were written upon parchment usually made from goat skin. Another populer use is for drum skins.
Parchment  is prepared by liming (in a solution of quick lime) to loosen the hair follicles. After several days in this bath, the hair can then be scraped off and the under surface of the skin scraped clean. After that the  finished skins  are  sewn into a wooden frame to dry and shrink.

Parchment is still available today, but imported skins can carry  a small risk of harboring anthrax unless properly  treated.

Gallery

See also
 List of goat breeds
 Goats as pets
 List of goat dishes

Further reading

References

Animal breeding
Goats